Pyrenocines are antibiotic mycotoxins.

Chemical structures

References

Antibiotics
Mycotoxins